Ronnie Claire Edwards (February 9, 1933 – June 14, 2016) was an American actress, best known for playing Corabeth Walton Godsey on the TV series The Waltons.

Early life
Edwards was born and raised in Oklahoma City, Oklahoma.

Acting career
Edwards acted professionally from 1963 and is best known for the role of the domineering Corabeth Walton Godsey, the wife of storekeeper Ike Godsey played by Joe Conley, in the CBS television series The Waltons, created by Earl Hamner, Jr. She played Charlene's mother Ione Frazier on two episodes of CBS's Designing Women. In 1983, Edwards played Aunt Dolly in Hamner's series Boone, which was cancelled after 10 episodes had aired. She co-starred in the NBC series Sara (1985) opposite Geena Davis. She briefly appeared on an episode of PBS's Antiques Roadshow (2008) from Dallas, Texas, when she brought in for appraisal a chair formerly owned by P.T. Barnum. She also appeared in the Star Trek: The Next Generation episode "Thine Own Self" and the remake of Inherit the Wind (1999).

In 2008, HBO decided not to air the television series 12 Miles of Bad Road, in which Edwards had a role. She subsequently retired from acting.

Her work in films included The Dead Pool (1988).

Other
Edwards was the author of several books, including memoirs published in 2012. In 2000, The Knife Thrower's Assistant: Memoirs of a Human Target was published. She previously had created and performed a one-woman show under the same title, which she took to the Edinburgh Fringe in 1993. She also co-wrote a musical play Idols of the King as a tribute to Elvis Presley's career, legacy and most passionate fans.

Personal life and death
Edwards restored a 1911 Catholic church on Swiss Avenue in Dallas and made it her home after selling her mansion in Los Angeles to Red Hot Chili Peppers bassist Flea in 2008. She died of chronic obstructive pulmonary disease in her sleep on June 14, 2016 at age 83.

Filmography

Film

Television

References

Further reading
 Ronnie Claire Edwards, The Knife Thrower's Assistant: Memoirs of a Human Target, Hawk Publishing Group, (October 2000),

External links
 
 

1933 births
2016 deaths
Actresses from Oklahoma City
American film actresses
American television actresses
Writers from Oklahoma City
21st-century American women
The Waltons